Argenteuil is an 1874 oil on canvas painting by Édouard Manet (1832-1883), first exhibited at the Paris Salon of 1875. It is one of Manet's first works to qualify fully as an Impressionist work, due to its naturalistic subject and its bold palette, such as the blue of the river, mocked by the Figaro journalist Jean Rousseau as "in the foreground, Argenteuil jam on an indigo river" It is now in the Musée des beaux-arts in Tournai, Belgium.

From 1872 onwards Manet's themes and brighter palette were echoing those of Claude Monet and Auguste Renoir. He spent summer 1874 in Gennevilliers and took the chance to visit his friend Monet, who had lived at Argenteuil since 1873. The surrounding villages beside the Seine were then full of Impressionist painters - as well as Manet and Monet, Renoir frequently travelled there and Gustave Caillebotte was based at Petit-Gennevilliers. He also produced The Monet Family in their Garden (1874, New York, Metropolitan Museum of Art) and Claude Monet Painting in his Studio (1874, Munich, Neue Pinakothek) in the open air that summer whilst in close contact with Monet.

The work shows a man in a boater and a young woman sitting beside the Seine at Argenteuil (now in Val-d'Oise) - the village is in the background. Manet asked Claude Monet and his wife Camille to pose for the painting but they could not hold the pose for long enough. Manet's brother-in-law Rudolf Leenhoff or baron Barbier (a friend of Guy de Maupassant) was probably the model for the man, though the model for the woman is unknown.

References

Bibliography
  L. Venturi, La via dell'impressionismo : da Manet a Cézanne, G. Einaudi, 1970.
  Émile Zola, Mon salon : Manet. Écrits sur l'art, Garnier-Flammarion, 1970.
  J. Wilson-Bareau, « L'année impressionniste de Manet : Argenteuil et Venise en 1874 », Revue de l'Art, 1989.
  P. Bonafoux, De Manet à Caillebotte : les impressionnistes à Gennevilliers, Éditions Plume, 1993.

External links
 

Argenteuil
Paintings by Édouard Manet
1874 paintings
Paintings in the collection of the Musée des Beaux-Arts, Tournai
Ships in art